The Electra Building is a major structure in Vancouver, British Columbia.

History
The structure was built by John Laing & Sons in 1957 as the new headquarters for the BC Electric Company, under its president Dal Grauer. A few days after Grauer's death in 1961, it became part of a new provincial crown corporation named BC Hydro. The 21 story, 89 m (293 ft), building was designed by Charles Edward "Ned" Pratt. At the time it was claimed to be the tallest office building in the Commonwealth, although this was not true. After BC Hydro moved to new offices in Vancouver and Burnaby in the late 1990s, the building was sold, and in 1998, was renovated and converted primarily into residential condo space, although BC Hydro continues to operate the Dal Grauer Substation, whose space is integral with Electra.

While BC Electric's offices were in the building ten large air horns on top of the structure played the first four notes of O Canada at noon every day.  The horns have since been moved to the Pan Pacific Vancouver roof. They are owned and managed by Canada Place.

See also
List of tallest buildings in Vancouver

References

Sources

External links
 Emporis facts about the Electra building
 City of Vancouver Press Release concerning Chemical Spill
 Article on the Electra spill in The Province, September 21, 2010

Buildings and structures in Vancouver
Heritage buildings in Vancouver
Residential condominiums in Canada
Modernist architecture in Canada
BC Hydro